Koren is a surname or given name, which has multiple origins. Koren may be a variant of the German occupational surname Korn, meaning a dealer in grain. In Slavic-speaking countries, it is a surname derived from a word meaning "root"; variants include Kořen (Czech), Koreň (Slovak), Korzeń (Polish), and Koren (Slovene).

Alternatively, the name may be a variant of the Greek female name Kora, which means "maiden". Koren may also be a surname or masculine given name of Hebrew origin, which means "gleaming". The name Koren may refer to:

Surname
Christiane Koren (1764–1815), Norwegian writer
Ulrik Vilhelm Koren (1826–1910), Norwegian-American pastor, theologian, and author
Dani Koren (born 1945), Israeli politician
Daniel Koren (born 1984), Israeli musician
Ed Koren (born 1935), American writer and cartoonist
Einar Sand Koren (born 1984), Norwegian handball player
Elad Koren (born 1968), Israeli football player
Eliyahu Koren (1907–2001), Israeli graphic artist
Gal Koren (born 1992), Slovene ice hockey player
Gideon Koren (born 1947), Canadian pediatrician
Haim Koren (born 1953), Israeli diplomat
John Koren (1861–1923) was an American clergyman and U.S. International Prison Commissioner
Katja Koren (born 1975), Slovene skier
Kristijan Koren (born 1986), Slovene cyclist
Leonard Koren, (born 1948), American artist
Majda Koren (born 1960), Slovene writer 
Nurit Koren (born 1960), Israeli politician
Petter Mørch Koren (1910–2004), Norwegian politician
Robert Koren (born 1980), Slovene football player
Steve Koren (born 1966), American screenwriter
Ziv Koren (born 1970), Israeli photojournalist

Given name
Koren Jelela (born 1987), Ethiopian runner
Koren Robinson (born 1980), American football player
Koren Shadmi (born 1981), Israeli illustrator
Koren Zailckas (born 1980), American writer
Jada Pinkett Smith (born 1971 as Jada Koren Pinkett), American Actress

See also
Coren

References

German-language surnames
Jewish surnames

bg:Корен (пояснение)
ceb:Koren
cs:Kořen (rozcestník)
de:Koren
hr:Korijen
nl:Koren
pl:Korzeń (ujednoznacznienie)
ru:Корень (значения)
sk:Koreň
sl:Koren